Dupleix House is a historic house located at 106 Lafayette Street in Youngsville, Louisiana.

Built c.1895 as a single story cottage and enlarged c.1910 by Pierre Alcide Dupleix, the house is a large two-story frame residence with Queen Anne and Colonial Revival elements. To the rear of the house there are two sheds which are considered contributing elements.

The house was listed on the National Register of Historic Places on October 4, 1984.

See also
 National Register of Historic Places listings in Lafayette Parish, Louisiana

References

Houses on the National Register of Historic Places in Louisiana
Colonial Revival architecture in Louisiana
Queen Anne architecture in Louisiana
Houses completed in 1910
Lafayette Parish, Louisiana
National Register of Historic Places in Lafayette Parish, Louisiana